Anokhino is a rural locality (a village) in Sidorovskoye Rural Settlement, Gryazovetsky District, Vologda Oblast, Russia. The population was 334 as of 2002 and 100% of the population was of Russian ethnicity. There are 2 streets.

Geography 
Anokhino is located 38 km southeast of Gryazovets (the district's administrative centre) by road. Panovo is the nearest rural locality.

References 

Rural localities in Gryazovetsky District